Money Game is a 2020 South Korean television series starring Go Soo, Lee Sung-min and Shim Eun-kyung. It aired on tvN from January 15 to March 5, 2020 every Wednesday and Thursday at 21:30 time slot.

Synopsis
As the South Korean government fears that the 1997 Asian financial crisis is about to repeat itself, three people working at the Financial Services Commission and the Ministry of Economy and Finance try their best to avoid the coming crisis.

Cast

Main
 Go Soo as Chae Yi-hun
 Lee Sung-min as Heo Jae
 Shim Eun-kyung as Lee Hye-joon

Supporting
 Choi Deok-moon as Gook Kyeong-min
 Choi Woong as Han Sang-min
 Choi Byung-mo as Na Joon-pyo
 Jo Jae-ryong as Jo Hee-bong
 Oh Ryoong as Park Soo-jong
 Teo Yoo as Eugene Han
 Aprilann as Tina Bahama 
 Amy Aleha as Shannon
 Bang Eun-hee as Lee Man-ok
 Kim Jung-pal as Jin Soo-ho
 Mi Ram as Jin Ma-ri
 Song Jae-ryong as Kang Nam-jin
 Kim Seung-wook as Kang Won-hee
 Jung Dong-hwan as Chae Byeong-hak
 Jeon Moo-song as Elder Kwak
 Yoo Seung-mok as Seo Wang-yeo (ep. #5)
 Park Ji-il as Kim Ho-joong

Production

 First script reading was held and filming began in summer 2019.
 This series marked Shim Eun-kyung's small-screen comeback after 5 years since Naeil's Cantabile.

Viewership

Notes

References

External links
  
 
 

TVN (South Korean TV channel) television dramas
Korean-language television shows
2020 South Korean television series debuts
2020 South Korean television series endings
Television series by Studio Dragon
Television series by JS Pictures